Elizabeth I is a two-part 2005 British-American historical drama television serial directed by Tom Hooper, written by Nigel Williams, and starring Helen Mirren as Elizabeth I of England. The drama covers approximately the last 24 years of her nearly 45-year reign.  Part 1 focuses on the final years of her relationship with the Earl of Leicester, played by Jeremy Irons.  Part 2 focuses on her subsequent relationship with the Earl of Essex, played by Hugh Dancy.

The series originally was broadcast in the United Kingdom in two two-hour segments on Channel 4. It later aired on HBO in the United States, CBC and TMN in Canada, ATV in Hong Kong, ABC in Australia, and TVNZ Television One in New Zealand.

The series went on to win Emmy, Peabody, and Golden Globe Awards.

Plot

Part 1
In 1579, Elizabeth I refuses to marry. Her chief advisor, Lord Burghley, and her spymaster, Francis Walsingham, plan to have her wed the Duke of Anjou in order to cement an English-French alliance against Spain while her favourite, the Earl of Leicester, opposes the plan due to his own long-standing affections for her. Upon arriving in England, the Duke meets and courts Elizabeth, gaining her favour. She later decides not to marry him after Burghley dissuades her from following through due to negative popular opinion towards the match.

Over time, Walsingham gathers evidence to prove that Elizabeth's Catholic cousin Mary, Queen of Scots is plotting to have her killed.  Elizabeth is reluctant to have Mary executed because of the war it would likely ignite between England and Spain. During a secret meeting, Mary gives Elizabeth her word that she does not want her dead. Elizabeth hesitantly gives Leicester command of the English campaign to assist the Dutch against Spain, which fails.  Once it is proven that Mary has in fact been conspiring against Elizabeth's life, Mary is judged guilty of treason and later executed.

After negotiations between England and Spain fail, a fleet of Spanish ships are sent for England.  Elizabeth gives Leicester command of the land forces and rides with him and his stepson the Earl of Essex to Tilbury, where they expect the Spanish to attempt a landing and where Elizabeth delivers a speech to the troops.  The Spanish Armada is ultimately defeated, but Leicester falls gravely ill just as they learn of the English victory.  Later, on his deathbed, Leicester bids Essex to take care of Elizabeth.

Part 2
By 1589, Elizabeth has made a favourite of Essex and falls in love with him.  She is openly outraged when he takes part in an English military expedition to Lisbon against her wishes, but she forgives him in spite of his failure to take the city from the Spanish.  She grants him 10 percent of a tax on sweet wines and a seat on the Privy Council, of which Lord Burghley's son Robert Cecil was also recently made a member.  Essex and Cecil develop a rivalry, as illustrated by the affair of Elizabeth's physician Dr. Lopez, who is hanged based on evidence brought forth by Essex of his participation in a Spanish plot against Elizabeth, evidence proven questionable after the fact by Cecil.

Essex's political ambitions begin to clash with his devotion and loyalty to Elizabeth.  As Elizabeth finds her young lover's behavior becoming increasingly worrisome, she draws closer to Cecil, who is named Secretary of State following the death of Walsingham.  Essex is publicly hailed upon his return to England after taking Cadiz from the Spanish, but his relationship with Elizabeth begins to deteriorate.  She and Cecil suspect Essex of secretly communicating with James VI of Scotland, son of Mary, Queen of Scots, a potential successor to the English throne.  After Burghley's death, Elizabeth sends Essex to Ireland to put down a rebellion but he instead makes a truce and returns to England alone.  Elizabeth puts Essex under house arrest.

Essex and his followers fail to start a rebellion in London and are captured.  At his trial, Essex accuses Cecil of collaborating with Spain but has no evidence to prove this, and he is found guilty of treason and beheaded.  Some time later, Elizabeth becomes listless, going for three weeks without eating before making her way to her bed and requesting a priest, saying she is minded to die.

Cast
Eight actors receive billing in the opening credits of one or both parts of Elizabeth I:
 Helen Mirren as Queen Elizabeth I
 Jeremy Irons as Earl of Leicester
 Hugh Dancy as Earl of Essex
 Toby Jones as  Robert Cecil
 Patrick Malahide as Sir Francis Walsingham
 Ian McDiarmid as Lord Burghley
 Barbara Flynn as Mary, Queen of Scots
 Ewen Bremner as King James VI

The full cast of characters of each part is listed in the closing credits of each part.  Apart from those receiving star billing, those in Part 1 include:

 Jérémie Covillault as Duke of Anjou
 Simon Woods as Gifford
 Diana Kent as Lady Essex
 Toby Salaman as Dr Lopez
 Geoffrey Streatfeild as Sir Anthony Babington
 David Delve as Sir Francis Drake
 Martin Marquez as Don Bernardino de Mendoza
 Rimantas Bagdzevicius as Howard of Effingham

Apart from those receiving star billing and Salaman as Dr Lopez, those in Part 2 include:

 Will Keen as Francis Bacon
 Eddie Redmayne as Southampton
 Ben Pullen as Sir Walter Raleigh
 Charlotte Asprey as Frances Walsingham

Production
According to director Tom Hooper, Mirren "came onboard before the script was written because the feeling was that it was only worth doing if she would play it."   Hooper and Mirren had previously worked together on the police procedural drama Prime Suspect 6 (2003).  The project on Elizabeth I was originally going to be two hours and focus on her relationship with the Earl of Essex, but Mirren "felt that there should be more politics" according to writer Nigel Williams.  The series was filmed in Vilnius, Lithuania, where the massive sets were constructed inside a sports arena that was abandoned in the 1970s.   The Whitehall Palace set was constructed to scale from original plans.

Reception

Critical response
At Metacritic, which assigns a weighted average score out of 100 to reviews from mainstream critics, Elizabeth I received an average score of 81% based on 21 reviews.

David Wiegand of the San Francisco Chronicle wrote that Mirren's performance "is powerful enough to shatter your television screen, not to mention any notion you might have had that if you've seen one Elizabeth—Bette Davis, Glenda Jackson or Cate Blanchett, for example—you've seen them all."  He added that Irons, who he felt "has sometimes settled into craggy self-parody in lesser films [...] invests Leicester with as much depth and complexity as he can, and he is every bit Mirren's equal onscreen."

Brian Lowry of Variety felt that the second part was better than the first, praised Mirren's performance and wrote that "[director] Tom Hooper, who previously directed Mirren in Prime Suspect 6, indulges [writer Nigel] Williams' penchant for long, theatrical monologues, which require a little getting used to in the slow early going. Gradually, however, as with the best British costume drama, the narrative becomes absorbing."

Alessandra Stanley of The New York Times wrote that Mirren is "one of the few actresses working today who can actually convincingly play a historical figure in her 40s" and that Elizabeth I was more historically accurate than Elizabeth (1998), though she felt that "[the miniseries'] interpretation, like so many others, wallows in the painful self-pity of a powerful, aging woman who craves true love".  While the miniseries is visually "no match for the 1998 movie" to Stanley, she concludes that Elizabeth I offers "a richly drawn portrait of a powerful woman who is both ruthless and sentimental, formidable and mercurial, vain and likable."

Accolades

References

External links
 
 HBO Films: Elizabeth I
 

2005 American television series debuts
2005 British television series debuts
2005 American television series endings
2005 British television series endings
2000s American drama television series
2000s American television miniseries
2000s British drama television series
2000s British television miniseries
American biographical series
Best Miniseries or Television Movie Golden Globe winners
Channel 4 television dramas
Films about Elizabeth I
Films about Mary, Queen of Scots
Cultural depictions of James VI and I
Cultural depictions of Francis Drake
Cultural depictions of Walter Raleigh
Francis Bacon
English-language television shows
British films based on actual events
Films shot in Lithuania
HBO original programming
Peabody Award-winning television programs
Primetime Emmy Award for Outstanding Miniseries winners
Primetime Emmy Award-winning television series
Television series by All3Media
Television set in Tudor England
Works by Tom Hooper
American films based on actual events